Philipp Harant (born 20 February 1999) is a German professional footballer who plays as a centre-back for Chemie Leipzig.

Playing career
Harant made his professional debut for 1. FC Magdeburg in the 3. Liga on 20 July 2019, coming on as a substitute in the 87th minute for Jürgen Gjasula in the 4–2 home loss against Eintracht Braunschweig.

References

External links
 
 Profile at kicker.de

1999 births
Living people
People from Schönebeck
Footballers from Saxony-Anhalt
German footballers
Association football central defenders
1. FC Magdeburg players
VfB Germania Halberstadt players
Berliner AK 07 players
BSG Chemie Leipzig (1997) players
3. Liga players
Regionalliga players